is a Japanese anime television series produced by CloverWorks, directed by Tomohiko Itō and inspired by the novel The Millionaire Detective written by Yasutaka Tsutsui. 

It premiered on April 9, 2020, on Fuji TV's Noitamina anime programming block, but postponed programming after the second episode due to the COVID-19 pandemic. The series restarted its broadcasting from July 16 to September 24, 2020.

Plot
Daisuke Kambe, a detective with extreme personal wealth, is assigned to the Modern Crime Prevention Headquarters. Officers who have caused problems for the Metropolitan Police Department are sent to this place. Daisuke is partnered with Haru Katou, who is repulsed by Daisuke's bribery. Challenging mysteries unfold in front of the two detectives, who must work together to solve them.

Characters

The current head of the eminently wealthy and influential Kambe family. As a police officer, he uses his fabulous wealth and a collection of cutting-edge gadgets to solve crimes pragmatically, often resorting to outright bribery as his preferred investigative method. Furthermore, Daisuke is a skilled fighter with a surprisingly steel nerve, which is unfazed even in the face of dangers. He is currently a member of the Modern Crimes Prevention Task Force and frequently works with detective Haru Kato, who is frequently annoyed by Daisuke's habits of solving things with money. An artificial intelligence butler, HEUSC, usually assists Daisuke. The state-of-the-art aide commonly assists him in transferring money and hacking into other devices.

A young detective on the same task force as Kambe Daisuke, though he was previously a Division 1 detective but was forcibly transferred out after an incident embarrassing to the police. He is passionate about his job but has a quick temper, especially around Kambe or when innocent people are in danger. In particular, he is annoyed by Kambe's attitude that money can solve any problem.

 The ranking officer of the Modern Crimes Prevention Task Force, Kambe, and Kato's boss. He is very laid-back and quite cheerful and places a great deal of trust in his subordinates. He is usually found at his desk, enjoying his hobby of building plastic models.

 The oldest member of the task force and a veteran detective, formerly of the Investigative Division. Kato is highly respectful of Nakamoto's abilities and experience. He comes across as very sympathetic and uses this to manipulate confessions out of criminals. He is a lifelong chain-smoker. 

 Another member of the task force works only when he wants to and does not particularly enjoy his job. His main goal is to impress Motoyama from Security Division, on whom he has a substantial crush. The very mention of her name has a visible effect on his level of enthusiasm.

 The only woman on the task force with an addiction to sweets and snacks. She is normally found at headquarters, either drinking cups of tea or checking for new jobs around the office. 

 Another member of the task force. He loves gambling with a preference for horse and boat racing. 

 The current chief of Division 1, Kato's former boss. He prefers to take charge of himself; as such, all his subordinates place a great deal of trust in him. Despite no longer being Kato's boss, he still cares about him. 

 A detective from Division 1. He takes his job very seriously. It is implied he was Kato's partner in the past, but they now appear to have a strained relationship. 

 A genius mechanic and Daisuke Kambe's relative. She uses her innocent appearance to her advantage, enabling her to perform undercover work. She and Kambe live together in the family mansion and have a good relationship. Despite the dangers of her work, Kambe never stops her as he knows she is competent. While working together, she and Kambe are a highly effective team.

 Described as Kambe's butler who only communicates through Kambe's earpiece and the computer screen in his sunglasses. HEUSC is an advanced Artificial intelligence program that instantly responds to Kambe's requests and can seemingly manipulate other computer systems at will.

Production and release
On January 20, 2020, Noitamina announced that a new anime television series directed by Tomohiko Itō was in production. The series is animated by CloverWorks, with Taku Kishimoto handing series composition, Keigo Sasaki designing the characters, and Yugo Kanno composing the series' music. The opening theme titled "Navigator" is performed by SixTones while Okamoto's performs the series' ending theme song "Welcome My Friend". The series premiered its first two episodes on April 9, 2020 and April 16, 2020 respectively, but had to delay later episodes due to the COVID-19 pandemic. The series restarted its broadcasting on July 16, 2020, and ended on September 24, 2020.

Aniplex of America licensed the series, and streamed the series internationally outside Asia on FunimationNow, AnimeLab, and Wakanim. In Southeast Asia and South Asia, the series is licensed by Medialink and released on Ani-One YouTube channel, and iQIYI in Southeast Asia.

Episode list

Notes

References

External links
Anime official website 

Anime based on novels
Anime postponed due to the COVID-19 pandemic
Anime productions suspended due to the COVID-19 pandemic
Aniplex
CloverWorks
Comedy anime and manga
Detective anime and manga
Medialink
Mystery anime and manga
Noitamina